The History of Otis Redding is the first of numerous compilations of Otis Redding songs, featuring hits from 1962 to early 1967. Released one month prior to Redding's death in December 1967, it was the final album (and only compilation album) issued during his lifetime.

Track listing

See also
List of Billboard number-one R&B albums of 1968

References

Otis Redding albums
1967 compilation albums
Stax Records compilation albums